Thazhekkod may refer to several places in Kerala, India:
 Thazhekkod, Malappuram district
 Thazhekkad, Irinjalakkuda
 Thazhecode, Kozhikode District
 Thazhekad, Thrissur, site of one of the earliest St Thomas Christian communities; location of the Thazhekad Sasanam, an inscribed stone granting it certain privileges